Steven Brown Goldberg (14 October 1941 – 17 December 2022) was a native of New York City who chaired the Department of Sociology at the City College of New York (CCNY) from 1988 until his retirement in 2008. He is most widely known for his theory of patriarchy, which explains male domination through biological causes.

Books
Goldberg, Steven Brown, “The Inevitability of Patriarchy: Why the Biological Difference Between Men and Women Always Produces Male Domination,” (New York, New York: William Morrow and Company, 1973), 256 Pp., .
Goldberg, Steven Brown, “The Inevitability of Patriarchy: Why the Biological Difference Between Men and Women Always Produces Male Domination – Includes Response to Critics and Other New Material,” (New York, New York: William Morrow and Company Paperback Editions, 1973–1974), 318 Pp., .
Goldberg, Steven Brown, «La inevitabilidad del patriarcado,» (English: “The Inevitability of Patriarchy.”), (Madrid y México, Distrito Federal: Alianza Editorial – «Colección» «El Libro de Bolsillo» «series,» «colección» «sección humanidades» «series,» volúmen doble número 622 y Amalia Martín-Gamero, 1976), 271 Pp., .
Goldberg, Steven Brown, “The Inevitability of Patriarchy,” (London and New York, New York: Maurice Temple-Smith Publishers and William Morrow and Company, 1977), 224 Pp., .
Goldberg, Steven Brown, “On Male Dominance: The Inevitability of Patriarchy,” (London and New York, New York: Abacus, Sphere Books, Maurice Temple-Smith Publishers, and William Morrow and Company, 1979), 256 Pp., .
Goldberg, Steven Brown, “When Wish Replaces Thought: Why So Much of What You Believe Is False,” (Buffalo, New York: Prometheus Books, “American Anthropologist,” “Chronicles: A Magazine of American Culture,” “Ethics: An International Journal of Social, Political, and Legal Philosophy,” “Humboldt Journal of Social Relations,” “International Journal of Sociology and Social Policy,” “National Review,” “Policy Review,” “Psychiatry: Interpersonal and Biological Processes,” “Reflections,” “Transaction: Social Science and Modern Society,” and “American Journal of Physics,” 1991–1992), 216 Pp., .
Goldberg, Steven Brown, “Why Men Rule: A Theory of Male Dominance,” (Chicago, La Salle, and Peru, Illinois: Open Court Publishing Company, 1993), 254+XII Pp., .
Goldberg, Steven Brown, “Fads and Fallacies in the Social Sciences,” (Amherst and New York, New York: Humanity Books, Prometheus Books, Katherine Washburn, John Frank Thornton, “Dumbing Down: Essays on the Strip-Mining of American Culture,” W. W. Norton & Company, “Chronicles: A Magazine of American Culture,” “National Review,” “Gender Issues,” Transaction Publishers, “International Journal of Sociology and Social Policy,” “Transaction: Social Science and Modern Society,” “Journal of Recreational Mathematics,” Baywood Publishing Company, “The Saturday Review of Literature,” “The New Englander and Yale Review,” William Benno Helmreich, and “Heterodoxy Magazine,” 2003), 230 Pp., .
Goldberg, Steven Brown, “Mathematical Elegance: An Approachable Guide to Understanding Basic Concepts,” (New Brunswick, New Jersey, New York, New York, London, Abingdon-on-Thames, and Oxford: Transaction Publishers, Routledge, Taylor & Francis, and Informa, 2014–2015 and 2017), 123+XVI Pp., .

Reference

Further reading
 258+XII Pp.

External links
“Steven Goldberg: Logical Analysis of Social Questions.”
“Goldberg, Steven 1941 – Contemporary Authors: New Revision Series, Volume 148, Electronic Resource, Bio-Bibliographical Guide to Current Writers in Fiction, General Nonfiction, Poetry, Journalism, Drama, Motion Pictures, Television, and Other Fields.”

1941 births
2022 deaths
20th-century American anthropologists
20th-century American Jews
20th-century American male writers
20th-century American non-fiction writers
21st-century American anthropologists
21st-century American Jews
21st-century American male writers
21st-century American non-fiction writers
American anthropology writers
American Ashkenazi Jews
American sociologists
Anthropology educators
City College of New York alumni
City College of New York faculty
Cultural anthropologists
Educators from New York City
Jewish American non-fiction writers
Jewish American social scientists
Jewish anthropologists
Jewish sociologists
Patriarchy
Ricker College alumni
Scientists from New York City
Sociology educators
United States Marine Corps personnel
University of New Brunswick alumni
World record holders
Writers from New York City